Tanzwut is a German Neue Deutsche Härte and Medieval metal band which originated as a side project of Corvus Corax members. The band uses a Medieval theme during their live performances which are expressed through their stagecraft, costumes and choreography.

Their name is the German term for "dancing mania", but is directly translated with "dance rage". Tanzwut are known for their heavy use of bagpipes, an unusual instrument for a metal band. The group has achieved international success, filling concert halls as far away from their home country as Mexico.

The band's recent releases have been gravitating towards a more industrial metal approach, incorporating the use of more down-tuned guitars, harsher vocals and darker atmospheres. On Weiße Nächte ("White Nights") though, Tanzwut completely removed its industrial sound for a more refined classical approach centered around bagpipes with a heavy metal sound. However, some of the industrial influence returned with Höllenfahrt ("Hell Ride") and the band have written material in a more traditional style similar to that of Corvus Corax (Morus et Diabolus and Eselsmesse).

Band members 

 Mike "Teufel" Paulenz – bagpipe, lead vocals
 Der Zwilling – bass, bagpipe
 Thrymr – bagpipe, shawm
 Pyro – bagpipe, shawm
 Shumon – percussion, keyboard
 Oually – percussion, key drum, electronic drums, riesentara, keyboard
 Martin Ukrasvan – guitar, backing vocals, bagpipe, tromba marina

Former members 
 Koll. A. (a.k.a. "Meister Selbstfried") – bagpipe, shawm, cornett
 Brandan – guitar, bagpipe
 Tec – keyboard, programming
 Wim – bass guitar, bagpipe
 Patrick – electric guitar
 Castus – bagpipe, shawm
 Ardor – bagpipe, shawm
 Gast – keyboard, drum machine
 Norri – drums, percussion
 Hatz – keyboard, electronic drums

Discography

Studio albums
 Tanzwut ("Dance Rage") (1999)
 Labyrinth der Sinne ("Labyrinth of Senses") (2000) – #43 DAC Top Albums of 2000, Germany
 Ihr wolltet Spass ("You Wanted Fun") (2003)
 Schattenreiter ("Shadow Rider") (2006)
 Weiße Nächte ("White Nights") (2011)
 Morus et Diabolus (2011)
 Höllenfahrt ("Hell Ride") (2013)
 Eselsmesse ("Donkey Fair") (2014)
 Freitag der 13. ("Friday the 13th") (2015)
 Schreib es mit Blut ("Write It in Blood") (2016)
 Seemannsgarn ("Sailor's Yarn") (2019)
 Die Tanzwut kehrt zurück (2021)

Live albums
 Tanzwut – Live (DVD, 2004)

Singles
 "Exkremento" (album, 1998) (promo)
 "Augen zu" ("Eyes Closed") (1999)
 "Weinst du?" ("Are You Crying?") (feat. Umbra et Imago) (1999)
 "Verrückt" ("Insane") (1999)
 "Tanzwut" ("Dance Rage") (2000)
 "Bitte bitte" ("Please Please") (2000) (Die Ärzte cover)
 "Eiserne Hochzeit" ("Iron Wedding") (2001)
 "Götterfunken" ("God-descended") (2001)
 "Feuer und Licht" (feat. Umbra et Imago) ("Fire and Light") (2001)
 "Nein nein" ("No No") (2003) (promo)
 "Meer" ("Sea") (2003)
 "Hymnus Cantica" (2003)
 "Immer noch wach" ("Still Awake") (feat. Schandmaul) (2005)
 "Weiße Nächte" ("White Nights") (2011)
 "Das Gerücht" ("The Rumor") (2013)
 "Der Himmel brennt" ("The Sky Is Burning") (2013)
 "Unsere Nacht" ("Our Night") (2014)
 "Der Eselskönig" ("The Donkey King") (feat. Entr'Act) (2014)
 "Freitag der 13." ("Friday the 13th") (2015)
 "Stille Wasser" ("Silent Waters") (feat. Liv Kristine) (2016)

External links

 Official website

References

German heavy metal musical groups
Medieval metal musical groups
German industrial metal musical groups
German Neue Deutsche Härte music groups
Musical groups established in 1998
Musical groups from Berlin
EMI Records artists